Atlılar (formerly Sadiye) is a village in Toroslar district of Mersin Province where the capital city of Toroslar district is actually a part of Greater Mersin. The population of the village was 392. The village inhabitants are mostly of Circassian (Adyghe) origin. Following Russian–Circassian War in 1864, Adyghe people were expelled from Caucasus, their homeland, to the Ottoman Empire where they were settled in various regions in the Ottoman Empire. The earlier settlement of Circassians in Mersin was Mezitli at the Mediterranean Sea side. But they asked for cooler and high-altitude places and finally they were settled in this village . They named the village after Sadiye, a Circassian born female member of the Ottoman palace who helped them to find their new home. In the earlier years of Turkish Republic the village was specialized in horse breeding and accordingly it was renamed Atlılar ("Horsemen"). Presently Atlılar economy depends on cherry farming and cattle breeding.

References

External links
 Video show by Murat Han
 Images by Kansav Şahin

Villages in Toroslar District